Aglaomorpha fortunei, commonly known as gu-sui-bu, is a species of basket fern of the family Polypodiaceae. The plant is native to Eastern Asia, including eastern China.

It is used in traditional Chinese medicine. This species is also more frequently cited by Asian studies by its synonym, Drynaria fortunei; however, this is an illegitimate name, the correct name in the genus Drynaria being Drynaria roosii.

Description
Aglaomorpha fortunei is an epiphytic (growing on trees) or epipetric (growing on rocks) plant. Like other species of Aglaomorpha, they possess two frond types – a fertile foliage frond and a sterile nest frond.

Sterile nest fronds are rounded shallowly-lobed reddish-brown fronds overlapping each other. They bear no sori and form a 'basket' characteristic of the genus. The fertile fronds are larger and deeply lobed. They bear 1 to 3 sori arranged on both sides of the central rib.

Taxonomy
The species was first described in 1856 as Polypodium fortunei, with the name attributed to Gustav Kunze. In 1857, J. Smith transferred the species to the genus Drynaria, using the name "Drynaria fortunei". However, although widely used, this is an illegitimate name, because it had been published in 1855 for a different species. In 1992, Toshiyuki Nakaike published the replacement name, Drynaria roosii, which is the correct name for the species if placed in the genus Drynaria.

In the Pteridophyte Phylogeny Group classification of 2016 (PPG I), the genus Aglaomorpha is placed in the subfamily Drynarioideae of the family Polypodiaceae.

Medicinal uses
Preparations from the rhizomes of Aglaomorpha fortunei are used in traditional herbal medicine for aiding in the healing of bone fractures and for treating rheumatoid arthritis.

Pharmacological study 
Modern studies of Aglaomorpha fortunei have identified in vitro effects on isolated bone cells.

Flavan-3-ols and propelargonidins can be isolated from the rhizomes.

Vernacular names
Aglaomorpha fortunei is known as gu-sui-bu (骨碎補) in Chinese (English: "mender of shattered bones"). A reference to its use in traditional Chinese medicine for healing broken bones.

Other common names in Chinese include mao-chiang ('hairy ginger'), shih-pan chiang ('stony plate ginger'), wang-chiang, shih-chiang, hou-chiang ('monkey ginger'), p'a shan hu (mountain-climbing tiger), feng chiang, p-yen chiang, hou-sheng chiang, and hou chueh.

It is also known as gol-se-bo in Korean and Cốt toái bổ in Vietnamese.

See also
Bone healing
Basket ferns

References

Aglaomorpha
Ferns of Asia
Flora of China
Plants used in traditional Chinese medicine